The 1918 Tyler tornado was a deadly and destructive tornado that devastated the town of Tyler, Minnesota on Wednesday, August 21, 1918. The F4-estimated tornado hit the town at approximately 9:20 pm, killing 36 people and injuring over 100 others. It is the fourth-deadliest tornado in Minnesota's history.

See also
 Climate of Minnesota
 List of North American tornadoes and tornado outbreaks
 1919 Fergus Falls tornado

References

1918
Tornadoes of 1918
1918
1918 in Minnesota
1918 natural disasters in the United States
August 1918 events